Dia Cha is a notable Laotian American author and academic who has written books for both children and adults.

Early life
She was born in the early 1960s in Southeast Asia. She and her family members immigrated to the USA as refugees After the Vietnam War.

In 1975, Dia and the surviving members of her family, were forced to flee the advancing communist movement, Pathet Lao in their takeover of her home country of Laos. She soon found herself a refugee in Thailand.

She eventually settled in the United States in 1979, where she was able to begin formal studies in the ninth grade. In 1983, she graduated from Abraham Lincoln High School, in Denver, Colorado, ranking thirtieth in a class of 251 students. In 1987, she joined the Institute of Foreign Studies and spent a semester studying at the University of London.

Career
In December 1989, Dia received the degree of Bachelor of Arts in anthropology from Metropolitan State College, Denver, Colorado.  In December, 1992, she was awarded  a Master of Arts in applied anthropology from Northern Arizona University in Flagstaff, Arizona. After additional studies, she received the degree of Doctor of Philosophy from the University of Colorado at Boulder, Colorado. Dia Cha is considered to be the first Hmong women to receive her PHD.

In the 1990s, Dia wrote Dia's Story Cloth which is now considered to be one of the utmost popular books on Hmong story clothes. Along with Norma Livo, she co-wrote Folk Stories of the Hmong and Teaching with Folk Stories of the Hmong: An Activity Book. Her poetry and short stories have appeared in "Bamboo Among the Oaks" as well as the "Paj Ntaub Voice" Hmong literary journal.

Additionally, she was an Associate Professor of Anthropology and Ethnic Studies at St. Cloud State University, in St. Cloud, Minnesota. There, she taught courses in cultural anthropology, ethnic studies, Southeast Asian communities, Asian American studies, and Hmong studies.

, she was CEO of Your Consulting Services, Inc.

Bibliography

References

External links
 Dia Cha page at St. Cloud State University
 Dia's Story Cloth
 2005 Hmong Oral History Project Interview
 http://www.hmongstudies.com/ChaHSJ6.pdf

Laotian writers
Hmong writers
Laotian emigrants to the United States
American people of Hmong descent
1962 births
Living people
Laotian anthropologists
Hmong anthropologists
American anthropologists 
American writers of Laotian descent
American writers of Hmong descent